First Lieutenant Harry Linn Martin (January 4, 1911 – March 26, 1945) was a United States Marine Corps officer who posthumously received the Medal of Honor for his actions on Iwo Jima on March 26, 1945.

Biography
Harry Linn Martin was a member of the Ohio National Guard and graduated from Bucyrus High School and from Michigan State College in East Lansing, Michigan, where he majored in business administration. At State, he was on the football and wrestling teams and did some boxing and skiing. He was a member of Sigma Alpha fraternity and served two years in the Cavalry unit of the ROTC. Following graduation in 1936, he worked in Honolulu, Hawaii, as an office manager for the Hawaiian Construction Tunnel Company.

On August 25, 1943, he was commissioned a second lieutenant in the Marine Corps Reserve. Following schooling at Quantico, Virginia, 2dLt Martin completed the Engineers School at New River, North Carolina, and was designated an Engineer Officer on March 13, 1944. Assigned to 2nd Battalion, 16th Marines, engineer regiment of the 5th Marine Division, he joined Company C when the designation of the battalion was changed to 5th Pioneer Battalion.

Second Lieutenant Martin went overseas with his unit in the summer of 1944 and went into training at Hawaii. On February 19, 1945, he landed on Iwo Jima in the Volcano Islands and before the day ended he had already sustained a slight wound. He was promoted to first lieutenant on March 1, 1945, twenty-five days before his death.

A few minutes before dawn on the morning of March 26, the day the Iwo campaign officially closed, the Japanese launched a concentrated attack and penetrated the Marine lines in the area where 1st Lt Martin's platoon was bivouacked. He immediately organized a firing line among the men in the foxholes closest to his own, and temporarily stopped the headlong rush of the enemy. Several of his men were lying wounded in positions overrun by the enemy and the lieutenant was determined to rescue them. In the action which followed, he was severely wounded twice but continued to resist the enemy until he fell mortally wounded by a grenade.

The Medal of Honor and citation were presented to his parents by Secretary of the Navy James Forrestal at a ceremony in the Navy Department on May 6, 1946.

First Lieutenant Martin was buried in the 5th Division Cemetery at Iwo Jima. At the request of his mother, his remains were returned to Ohio in 1948 for private burial in Oakwood Cemetery, Bucyrus, Ohio.

Medal of Honor citation
The President of the United States takes pride in presenting the MEDAL OF HONOR posthumously to

for service as set forth in the following CITATION:
For conspicuous gallantry and intrepidity at the risk of his life above and beyond the call of duty as Platoon Leader attached to Company C, Fifth Pioneer Battalion, Fifth Marine Division, in action against enemy Japanese forces on Iwo Jima, Volcano Islands, 26 March 1945. With his sector of the Fifth Pioneer Battalion bivouac area penetrated by a concentrated enemy attack launched a few minutes before dawn, First Lieutenant Martin instantly organized a firing line with the Marines nearest his foxhole and succeeded, in checking momentarily the headlong rush of the Japanese. Determined to rescue several of his men trapped in positions overrun by the enemy, he defied intense hostile fire to work his way through the Japanese to the surrounded Marines. Although sustaining two severe wounds, he blasted the Japanese who attempted to intercept him, located his beleaguered men and directed them to their own lines. When four of the infiltrating enemy took possession of an abandoned machine-gun pit and subjected his sector to a barrage of hand grenades, First Lieutenant Martin alone and armed only with a pistol, boldly charged the hostile position and killed all its occupants. Realizing that his remaining comrades could not repulse another organized attack, he called to his men to follow and then charged into the midst of the strong enemy force, firing his weapon and scattering them until he fell, mortally wounded by a grenade. By his outstanding valor, indomitable fighting spirit and tenacious determination in the face of overwhelming odds, First Lieutenant Martin permanently disrupted a coordinated Japanese attack and prevented a greater loss of life in his own and adjacent platoons and his inspiring leadership and unswerving devotion to duty reflect the highest credit upon himself and the United States Naval Service. He gallantly gave his life in service of his country.
/S/ HARRY S. TRUMAN

Honors

The United States Navy Maritime prepositioning ship , is named in his honor.

See also

List of Medal of Honor recipients for World War II
List of Medal of Honor recipients for the Battle of Iwo Jima

Notes

References

External links

1911 births
1945 deaths
United States Marine Corps personnel killed in World War II
United States Marine Corps Medal of Honor recipients
United States Marine Corps officers
Battle of Iwo Jima
People from Bucyrus, Ohio
World War II recipients of the Medal of Honor